Kong Shangren (1648 – 1718) was a Qing dynasty dramatist and poet best known for his chuanqi play The Peach Blossom Fan about the last days of the Ming dynasty.

Born in Qufu, Kong was a 64th-generation descendant of Confucius. He guided the Kangxi Emperor when he visited Qufu.

The Peach Blossom Fan tells the story of the love story between the scholar Hou Fangyu and the courtesan Li Xiangjun, against the dramatic backdrop of the short history of the Southern Ming. It remains a favourite of the Kun opera (kunqu) stage.

Kong Shangren is known as the author of a curious poem dedicated to the eyeglasses, a Western innovation brought to Macau by the Portuguese.

References

Further reading
 Owen, Stephen, "Kong Shang-ren, Peach Blossom Fan: Selected Acts," in Stephen Owen, ed. An Anthology of Chinese Literature: Beginnings to 1911. New York: W. W. Norton, 1997. p. 942-972 ( (Archive).
 Strassberg, Richard, The World of K'ung Shang-jen: A Man of Letters in Early Ch'ing China. New York: Columbia University Press, 1983.

External links
 
 

1648 births
1718 deaths
Qing dynasty poets
People from Qufu
Poets from Shandong
Descendants of Confucius
Writers from Jining
18th-century Chinese dramatists and playwrights
17th-century Chinese dramatists and playwrights